Claude Miller (March 14, 1914 – July 10, 1974) was an American Negro league pitcher in the 1930s.

A native of Clarksdale, Mississippi, Miller played for the St. Louis Stars in 1937. He died in St. Louis, Missouri in 1974 at age 60.

References

External links
 and Seamheads

1914 births
1974 deaths
St. Louis Stars (1937) players
Baseball pitchers
Baseball players from Mississippi
Sportspeople from Clarksdale, Mississippi
20th-century African-American sportspeople